Was Here may refer to:

 Was Here (Shape Shifters album)
 Was Here (Subtle album)

See also
 Kilroy was here